The Water Tower Belvedere is a water tower of reinforced concrete construction in Aachen, Germany, located on the Lousberg hill. It was built in 1956. 

The water tower accommodates a revolving restaurant, which reopened in 2005 after being closed for several years (it closed again for one year, but was reopen again in 2012). The restaurant revolves once every 56 minutes. Service includes a restaurant, a beer garden and a traditional Sunday brunch.

See also
 List of towers

Towers with revolving restaurants
Water towers in Germany
Infrastructure completed in 1956
Towers completed in 1956
Buildings and structures in Aachen
1956 establishments in West Germany